Tanya Gogova Ayshinova (born 28 April 1950) is a Bulgarian former volleyball player who competed in the 1980 Summer Olympics.

She was born in Kardzhali.

In 1980 she was part of the Bulgarian team which won the bronze medal in the Olympic tournament. She played all five matches.

External links
 Official profile

1950 births
Living people
Bulgarian women's volleyball players
Olympic volleyball players of Bulgaria
Volleyball players at the 1980 Summer Olympics
Olympic bronze medalists for Bulgaria
People from Kardzhali
Olympic medalists in volleyball
Medalists at the 1980 Summer Olympics